Flight 708 may refer to

Pan Am Flight 708, crashed on 15 November 1966
Garuda Indonesia Flight 708, crashed on 16 February 1967
Hawthorne Nevada Airlines Flight 708, crashed on February 18, 1969
Ethiopian Airlines Flight 708, hijack attempt on 8 December 1972
West Caribbean Airways Flight 708, crashed on 16 August 2005

0708